Gargantilla may refer to:

Gargantilla, a municipality of the Province of Cáceres, Extremadura, Spain
Gargantilla del Lozoya y Pinilla de Buitrago, a municipality of the Community of Madrid, Spain
The Spanish word for choker or necklace.